Moses Georgios was ruler of the Nubian kingdom of Makuria. During his reign it is believed that the crown of Alodia was also under the control of Makuria. He is mostly known for his conflict with Saladin.

Life and reign
In 1171, the Ayyubids overthrew the Fatimid caliphate of Egypt. This brought Makuria and the Ayyubids into conflict with each other. The following year, a Makurian army pillaged Aswan and advanced even further north. It is not clear if this campaign was intended to aid the Fatimids or was merely a raid exploiting the unstable situation in Egypt, although the latter seems more likely, as the Makurians apparently soon withdrew. To deal with the Nubians, Saladin sent his brother Turan-Shah. The latter conquered Qasr Ibrim in January 1173, reportedly sacking it, taking many prisoners, pillaging the church, and converting it into a mosque. Afterward, he sent an emissary to King Moses Georgios, intending to answer a previously requested peace treaty with a pair of arrows. Moses Georgios was a man confident in his ability to resist the Ayyubid army, stamping with hot iron a cross on the emissary's hand. Turan Shah withdrew from Nubia but left a detachment of Kurdish troops in Qasr Ibrim, which would raid Lower Nubia for the next two years. Archaeological evidence links them with the destruction of the cathedral of Faras, Abdallah Nirqi, and Debeira West. In 1175, a Nubian army finally arrived to confront the invaders at Adindan. Before battle, however, the Kurdish commander drowned while crossing the Nile, resulting in the retreat of Saladin's troops out of Nubia. Afterwards, there was peace for another 100 years in which Georgios had independence over Nubia while Aswan was reoccupied by the Ayyubids and a garrison of Kurdish soldiers was stationed in Aswan.

References

Kingdom of Makuria
History of Sudan
Nubian people
12th-century rulers in Africa